An aeroallergen (pronounced aer·o·al·ler·gen) is any airborne substance, such as pollen or spores, which triggers an allergic reaction.

Pollens

Aeroallergens include the pollens of specific seasonal plants is commonly known as "hay fever", because it is most prevalent during haying season, from late May to the end of June in the Northern Hemisphere; but it is possible to experience hay fever throughout the year.

The pollen which causes hay fever varies from person to person and from region to region; generally speaking, the tiny, hardly visible pollens of wind-pollinated plants are the predominant cause. Pollens of insect-pollinated plants are too large to remain airborne and pose no risk.

Examples of plant pollen commonly responsible for hay fever include:
 Trees: such as birch (Betula), alder (Alnus), cedar (Cedrus), hazel (Corylus), hornbeam (Carpinus), horse chestnut (Aesculus), willow (Salix), poplar (Populus), plane (Platanus), linden/lime (Tilia) and olive (Olea). In northern latitudes birch is considered to be the most important allergenic tree pollen. An estimated 15–20% of those with hay fever are sensitive to birch pollen grains. Olive pollen is most predominant in Mediterranean regions.
 Grasses (Family Poaceae): especially ryegrass (Lolium sp.) and timothy (Phleum pratense). An estimated 90% of those with hay fever are allergic to grass pollen.
 Weeds: ragweed (Ambrosia), plantain (Plantago), nettles/parietaria (Urticaceae), mugwort (Artemisia), Fat hen (Chenopodium) and sorrel/dock (Rumex)

The time of year at which hay fever symptoms manifest themselves varies greatly depending on the types of pollen to which an allergic reaction is produced. The pollen count, in general, is highest from mid-spring to early summer. As most pollens are produced at fixed periods in the year, a person with long-term hay fever may also be able to anticipate when the symptoms are most likely to begin and end, although this may be complicated by an allergy to dust particles.

Spores

In fungi, both asexual and sexual spores or sporangiospores of many fungal species are actively dispersed by forcible ejection from their reproductive structures, which travel through the air over long distances. Many fungi thereby possess specialized mechanical and physiological mechanisms as well as spore-surface structures, such as hydrophobins, for spore ejection. These mechanisms include, for example, forcible discharge of ascospores enabled by the structure of the ascus and accumulation of osmolytes in the fluids of the ascus that lead to explosive discharge of the ascospores into the air. The forcible discharge of single spores termed ballistospores involves formation of a small drop of water (Buller's drop), which upon contact with the spore leads to its projectile release with an initial acceleration of more than 10,000 g. Other fungi rely on alternative mechanisms for spore release, such as external mechanical forces, exemplified by puffballs.

Foodstuffs
It is commonly thought that peanuts and other allergic foodstuffs may become airborne, thus triggering allergic reactions in susceptible individuals, especially children.

However, one report notes:

Eosinophilic gastroenteritis

Eosinophilic gastroenteritis (EG) is a rare and heterogeneous condition characterized by patchy or diffuse eosinophilic infiltration of gastrointestinal (GI) tissue, first described by Kaijser in 1937. Aeroallergens can cause EG.

The stomach is the organ most commonly affected, followed by the small intestine and the colon.

As a part of host defense mechanism, eosinophil is normally present in gastrointestinal mucosa, though finding in deeper tissue is almost always pathologic. What triggers such dense infiltration in EG is not clear. It is possible that different pathogenetic mechanisms of disease is involved in several subgroups of patients. Food allergy and variable IgE response to food substances has been observed in some patients which implies role of hypersensitive response in pathogenesis. Many patients indeed have history of other atopic conditions like eczema, asthma etc.

Eosinophil recruitment into inflammatory tissue is a complex process, regulated by a number of inflammatory cytokines. In EG cytokines IL-3, IL-5 and granulocyte macrophage colony stimulating factor (GM-CSF) may be behind the recruitment and activation. They have been observed immunohistochemically in diseased intestinal wall.
In addition eotaxin has been shown to have an integral role in regulating the homing of eosinophils into the lamina propria of stomach and small intestine.
In the allergic subtype of disease, it is thought that food allergens cross the intestinal mucosa and trigger an inflammatory response that includes mast cell degranulation and recruitment of eosinophils.

EG is "managed" (treated) with corticosteroids, with a 90% response rate in some studies. Various steroid sparing agents e.g. sodium cromoglycate (a stabilizer of mast cell membranes), ketotifen (an antihistamine), and montelukast (a selective, competitive leukotriene receptor antagonist) have been proposed, centering on an allergic hypothesis, with mixed results. An elimination diet may be successful if a limited number of food allergies are identified.

See also
 Aerobiology

References

Food allergies
Allergology
Articles containing video clips